World War I armistice may refer to:
Armistice of Focșani, signed 9 December 1917 between Romania and the Central Powers
Armistice between Russia and the Central Powers, signed 15 December 1917
Armistice of Erzincan, signed 18 December 1917 between the Ottoman Empire and Russia
Armistice with Bulgaria, signed 29 September 1918 at Thessaloniki
Armistice of Mudros, signed 30 October 1918 with the Ottoman Empire
Armistice of Villa Giusti, signed 3 November 1918 between Italy and Austria-Hungary
Armistice with Germany, signed 11 November 1918 at Compiègne
Armistice of Belgrade, signed on 13 November 1918 between France and the First Hungarian Republic